Lost Cherrees is an anarcho-punk band from London, UK, originally active from 1979 to 1986 and reformed in 2003.

History
Lost Cherrees were formed in Sutton in 1979 by drummer Steve Battershill, guitarist Dave Greaves, and singer Siân Jeffreys. They recorded six tracks and released them on cassette as The Worst Demo Ever Recorded, which was split with the band Warning. In 1981, Greaves left the band and was replaced by Andy Rolfe, while Battershill switched to bass and new drummer Warren "Nuts" Samuels joined. This lineup recorded another demo in 1982, which was released on the Bluurg label.

The band's first proper gig was at the Swan pub in Kingston in July 1983 with the band Riot/Clone. The two bands starting working together regularly, leading to the first official Lost Cherrees single release, "No Fighting, No War, No Trouble, No More" on Riot/Clone's label in late 1983. John Peel became an unexpected supporter of the song, and it reached number 27 on the UK Independent Singles chart. Their next single, "A Man's Duty,  A Woman's Place," from a five-track EP of the same title, was released in 1984 and reached number 8 on the UK Independent Singles chart. 

The band made the news after a gig at the Surbiton Assembly Rooms, which ended in a pitched battle on the streets of Surbiton with the Special Patrol Group; the incident was reported as a riot in next day's national press. During this period, the band added keyboardist Gail Thibert and singer Beverly Cook-Abbott. Founding singer Siân Jeffreys announced her departure and the band recruited Debbie McKenna as her replacement. Jeffreys then decided to stay on and the band continued with an unconventional seven-member lineup with three female lead singers. 

Lost Cherrees contributed two songs to the compilation Who? What? Why? When? Where? in 1984. They also contributed a partially spoken-word track to the compilation We Don't Want Your Fucking War in 1984. Their first full album, All Part of Growing Up, engineered by Mad Professor and Patrick Donegan, was released on Fight Back Records in 1985. The album reached number 9 on the UK Independent Albums chart. Jeffreys left the band shortly before the album's release and joined Blyth Power. Lost Cherrees attracted attention for pushing the boundaries of punk rock, with female singers, keyboards, and reggae elements. Their 1985 EP Unwanted Children featured a horn section.  

At a gig in Birmingham in 1986, singer Bev Cook-Abbott got into an argument with audience members over sexist comments and announced that this would be the last performance by Lost Cherrees, and the band agreed to break up due to disillusionment with their disappointing record sales. The band members participated in various other projects over the next 17 years. In 2003, Battershill learned that Lost Cherrees tracks were being traded on Napster and reformed the band with Cook-Abbott, Nuts, and Rolfe. They were unable to locate Jeffreys, Thibert, and McKenna, leaving Cook-Abbott as the only lead singer, though Rolfe soon took on additional vocal duties. This lineup began performing regularly in 2003 and were able to reestablish contact with the three missing members, who made occasional special appearances with the band onstage. In September 2003 Lost Cherrees played at the Gathering of the Thousands punk festival with many other bands from their original 1980s punk scene. 
 
Also in 2003, the band released the compilation In the Beginning as part of a project in which their early works were re-released. They released the five-track EP Another Bite of the Cherrees in early 2004. While touring in 2004, Bev Cook-Abbott had to take time off due to vocal cord nodules and was temporarily replaced by Joey Hill. The studio album Free to Speak, But Not to Question was released in early 2006 and was praised by AllMusic as "one of those so-rare examples of a band picking up precisely where they left off, and then astonishing every ear by proving that they lost absolutely nothing during their absence."

References

External links
[ Allmusic.com's entry on Lost Cherrees]

Anarcho-punk groups
English punk rock groups